Reverend William Hickey, also known as Martin Doyle (1787 – 24 October 1875) was an Irish writer and philanthropist.

Life
A descendant of the Ó hÍceadha family of physicians, he was the eldest son of Rev. Ambrose Hickey, Church of Ireland rector of Murragh, County Cork. He graduated from St. John's College, Cambridge, and received his M.A. from the University of Dublin. He was ordained in 1811 and appointed curate of Dunleckny, County Carlow. Between then and 1834 he served at Bannow, Kilcormick, Wexford and Mulrankin, remaining at the latter till his death. A Compendium of Irish Biography says of him:

Hickey, under the pseudonym Martin Doyle, served as an editor for The Irish Farmer's and Gardener's Magazine.

William Hickey was the father of J. S. Hickey, Protestant rector of Goresbridge, and grandfather of the author and poet, Emily Henrietta Hickey.

Select bibliography

 Hints to Small Farmers 
 The Hurlers
 Irish Cottagers
 Plea for Small Farmers 
 Address to Landlords 
 The Kitchen Garden 
 The Flower Garden
 Hints on Emigration to Canada 
 Hints on Health
 Temperance and Morals 
 Book on Proverbs
 Cyclopaedia of Practical Husbandry
 French Sermons by Monod (translator)  
 Notes and Gleanings of the County Wexford

References

External links
 http://www.libraryireland.com/biography/ReverendWilliamHickey.php

1787 births
1875 deaths
Alumni of St John's College, Cambridge
19th-century Irish philosophers
19th-century Irish writers
People from County Wexford